The following lists the top 25 (end of year) charting singles on the Australian Singles Charts, for the year of 1983. These were the best charting singles in Australia for 1983. The source for this year is the Kent Music Report.

These charts are calculated by David Kent of the Kent Music Report.

References

Australian record charts
1983 in Australian music
1983 record charts